The 2016 Dunlop World Challenge was a professional tennis tournament played on indoor hard courts. It was the 9th edition of the tournament and part of the 2016 ATP Challenger Tour and the 2016 ITF Women's Circuit, offering $50,000+H each in prize money for both men and women's events. It took place in Toyota, Japan, on 14–20 November 2016.

Men's singles main draw entrants

Seeds 

 1 Rankings as of 7 November 2016.

Other entrants 
The following players received wildcards into the singles main draw:
  Makoto Ochi
  Yusuke Takahashi
  Yosuke Watanuki
  Yusuke Watanuki

The following players received entry from the qualifying draw:
  Kento Takeuchi
  Lim Yong-kyu
  Michał Przysiężny
  Yaraslav Shyla

Women's singles main draw entrants

Seeds 

 1 Rankings as of 7 November 2016.

Other entrants 
The following player received a wildcard into the singles main draw:
  Haruka Kaji
  Momoko Kobori
  Michika Ozeki
  Ramu Ueda

The following players received entry from the qualifying draw:
  Miharu Imanishi
  Kim Na-ri
  Tori Kinard
  Chihiro Muramatsu

Champions

Men's singles

 James Duckworth def.  Tatsuma Ito, 7–5, 4–6, 6–1

Women's singles

 Aryna Sabalenka def.  Lizette Cabrera, 6–2, 6–4

Men's doubles

 Matt Reid /  John-Patrick Smith def.  Jeevan Nedunchezhiyan /  Christopher Rungkat, 6–3, 6–4

Women's doubles

 Ksenia Lykina /  Akiko Omae def.  Rika Fujiwara /  Ayaka Okuno, 6–7(4–7), 6–2, [10–5]

External links 
 2016 Dunlop World Challenge at ITFtennis.com
 Official website 

 
2016 ITF Women's Circuit
2016 ATP Challenger Tour
2016 in Japanese tennis
November 2016 sports events in Japan